The Men's singles Squash event of the 2018 Commonwealth Games was held at the Oxenford Studios, Gold Coast. Singles play took place between 5 and 9 April. Englishman James Willstrop won gold after beating Paul Coll of New Zealand in straight games, 11-9, 11-4, 11-6.

Medallists

Seeds

Draws & Results

Main draw

Finals

Top Half

Section 1

Section 2

Bottom Half

Section 3

Section 4

References

Squash at the 2018 Commonwealth Games